The 7th Dallas–Fort Worth Film Critics Association Awards, honoring the best in film for 2001, were given on January 3, 2002.

Top 10 films
A Beautiful Mind (Academy Award for Best Picture)
Moulin Rouge!
Memento
The Lord of the Rings: The Fellowship of the Ring
In the Bedroom
Shrek
The Man Who Wasn't There
Mulholland Drive
Life as a House
Amélie (Le fabuleux destin d'Amélie Poulain)

Winners

Best Actor:
Russell Crowe – A Beautiful Mind
Best Actress:
Sissy Spacek – In the Bedroom
Best Animated Film:
Shrek
Best Cinematography:
The Lord of the Rings: The Fellowship of the Ring – Andrew Lesnie
Best Director:
Ron Howard – A Beautiful Mind
Best Film:
 A Beautiful Mind 
Best Foreign Language Film:
Amélie (Le fabuleux destin d'Amélie Poulain) • France
Best Supporting Actor:
Ben Kingsley – Sexy Beast
Best Supporting Actress:
Marisa Tomei – In the Bedroom
Worst Film:
Freddy Got Fingered

References

External links
 Dallas-Fort Worth Film Critics Association official website

2001
2001 film awards
2002 in Texas